Owston is a civil parish in the metropolitan borough of Doncaster, South Yorkshire, England.  The parish contains 20 listed buildings that are recorded in the National Heritage List for England.  Of these, one is listed at Grade I, the highest of the three grades, one is at Grade II*, the middle grade, and the others are at Grade II, the lowest grade.  The parish contains the village of Owston and the surrounding countryside.  The most important buildings in the parish are a church, which is listed together with the remains of a cross, and Owston Hall, also listed, together with associated structures.  The other listed buildings consist of houses, cottages and associated structures, and farmhouses and farm buildings.


Key

Buildings

References

Citations

Sources

 

Lists of listed buildings in South Yorkshire
Buildings and structures in the Metropolitan Borough of Doncaster